Emil Garipov (born August 15, 1991) is a Russian professional ice hockey goaltender of Tatar descent. He currently plays with Neftekhimik Nizhnekamsk in the Kontinental Hockey League (KHL).

Garipov made his KHL debut with Ak Bars Kazan during the 2011–12 season.

Awards and honours

References

External links

1991 births
Living people
Ak Bars Kazan players
Avangard Omsk players
Bars Kazan players
HC Dynamo Moscow players
HC Neftekhimik Nizhnekamsk players
Russian ice hockey goaltenders
Traktor Chelyabinsk players
Universiade medalists in ice hockey
Universiade gold medalists for Russia
Competitors at the 2011 Winter Universiade